Losta is a river in Vologodsky District, Vologda Oblast, Russia.

Losta may also refer to:

 Losta railway station, a railway station in Vologda, Russia
 Losta, a district in Vologda

See also 

Lotta (disambiguation)
 Lasta (disambiguation)